Munida agave is a species of squat lobster in the family Munididae. The specific epithet is derived from the name of one of Greek nereids, Agave.

References

Squat lobsters
Crustaceans described in 1993